Rose is the color halfway between red and magenta on the HSV color wheel, also known as the RGB color wheel, on which it is at hue angle of 330 degrees.

Rose is one of the tertiary colors on the HSV (RGB) color wheel. The complementary color of rose is spring green. Sometimes rose is quoted instead as the web-safe color FF00CC, which is closer to magenta than to red, corresponding to a hue angle near 320 degrees, or the web-safe color FF0077, which is closer to red than magenta, corresponding to a hue angle of about 340 degrees.

Shades of rose

Etymology of rose

The first recorded use of rose as a color name in English was in 1382.

The etymology of the color name rose is the same as that of the name of the rose flower.  The name originates from Latin rosa, borrowed through Oscan from colonial Greek in southern Italy: rhodon (Aeolic form: wrodon), from Aramaic wurrdā, from Assyrian wurtinnu, from Old Iranian *warda (cf. Avestan warda, Sogdian ward, Parthian wâr).

In culture
Geography
 British historian John William Burgon famously described the Jordanian city of Petra as being colored rose, writing:
Match me such marvel save in Eastern clime,
A rose-red city – half as old as time!
 Marrakech, Morocco is called the Rose City because many of its buildings are colored various tones of rose.
 Portland, Oregon is nicknamed "The Rose City" for the number of roses and rose gardens that thrive there.

Music
 "La Vie en rose" (French for "Life through rose-coloured glasses", literally "Life in pink") was the signature song of French singer Édith Piaf. Piaf first popularized the song in 1946. It has been covered by many artists since.
 Rose Colored Glasses is the 1978 debut album by country singer-songwriter John Conlee.

Occult
 According to New Age author C.W. Leadbeater, who claimed to be clairvoyant, of the seven types of etheric atoms that he claimed to be able to observe with his third eye circulating through the human etheric body (colored violet, blue, green, yellow, orange, dark red, and rose), the flow of the rose colored etheric atoms (also called by Leadbeater the rose vitality globule) from the sun into the rainbow colored spleen chakra is the most important since all the other etheric atoms are derived from it and the rose colored atom vivifies the nervous system. Leadbeater also asserted that humans feel good around pine trees because they radiate more rose colored etheric atoms than any other plant.

Politics
 The revolution in which previous Georgian president Mikhail Saakashvili came to power in 2003 was called the "Rose Revolution".

Religion
 In the Latin liturgical rites of the Catholic Church, priests may wear rose colored vestments on Gaudete Sunday (the third Sunday of Advent) and Laetare Sunday (the fourth Sunday of Lent).

See also
Amaranth (color)
Cerise (color)
Fuchsia (color)
Toulouse: "La Ville rose"
RAL 3017 Rose
Lists of colors

References

External links
ISCC-NBS Dictionary of Color Names (1955) – Color dictionary used by stamp collectors to identify the colors of stamps – See sample of the color [Dark] Persian rose (color sample #254) displayed on indicated page.
ISCC-NBS Dictionary of Color Names (1955) – Color Sample of Tea rose (color sample #28)

Tertiary colors